Chaetoleon is a genus of antlions in the family Myrmeleontidae. There are at least four described species in Chaetoleon.

Species
These four species belong to the genus Chaetoleon:
 Chaetoleon pumilis (Burmeister, 1839)
 Chaetoleon pusillus (Currie, 1899)
 Chaetoleon tripunctatus (Banks, 1922)
 Chaetoleon variabilis Banks, 1942

References

Further reading

 

Myrmeleontidae
Articles created by Qbugbot
Myrmeleontidae genera